Baini may refer to:

 Abbate Giuseppe Baini (1775–1844), Italian priest, music critic, conductor, and composer
 Baini Prashad (1894–1969), Indian zoologist
 Bambar Baini, regional incarnation of the Devi (Mother Goddess) closely identified with Amba